Cyber Spin is a futuristic racing video game that was released in 1992 to Japan and North America for the Super NES.

Gameplay

The game uses a top-down perspective and was designed in the same technique as classic arcade racing games. The vehicles of the two versions are completely different from each other. There are tracks all around the world. Players of the game become a part of a science-fiction version of the 2015 Formula One season. All of the automobiles are turbocharged with advanced futuristic technology that allows for extra speed every time a "Power Boost" is used (at the cost of the vehicle's energy reserves).

The player does not automatically qualify for a race and must beat a certain time limit to advance the storyline. There are a free mode and a GPX mode (Japanese release only), password mode, and scenario mode (with Japanese anime-like cut scenes in the Japanese version). Passwords consisting of letters and numbers help the player keep their progress in the game. In the scenario mode, the object is to guide an up-and-coming driver to the ultimate victory. Quitting once means game over. There is a different order of race tracks that the player confronts when comparing the Japanese version to the North American version. For example, the tracks in the earlier stages of the North American version are quite simple, while the Japanese version forces the player to compete against more "complex" race layouts starting from the second level.

Reception
Allgame gave this video game a score of 3 stars out of a possible 5.

See also
 Battle Grand Prix

References

External links
Japanese title at super-famicom.jp 

1992 video games
Arc System Works games
Future GPX Cyber Formula
Science fiction racing games
Racing video games set in the United States
Super Nintendo Entertainment System games
Super Nintendo Entertainment System-only games
Takara video games
Video games based on anime and manga
Video games developed in Japan
Video games set in the 2010s
Video games set in Africa
Video games set in Europe
Video games set in Japan
Video games set in South America
Single-player video games